Bonny Chesson (born 17 December 1950) is a Canadian equestrian. She competed in two events at the 1984 Summer Olympics.

References

External links
 

1950 births
Living people
Canadian female equestrians
Canadian dressage riders
Olympic equestrians of Canada
Equestrians at the 1984 Summer Olympics
Sportspeople from Newark-on-Trent